Gidle  is a village in Radomsko County, Łódź Voivodeship, in south-central Poland. It is the seat of the gmina (administrative district) called Gmina Gidle. In 2007 the village had a population of 1,540.

The previous names of the village included Gidzielice and Gidżle.

Gidle is the site of a Dominican monastery with a chapel of the miraculous figure of Mary, mother of Jesus. The sanctuary is a destination of religious pilgrimages from all over Poland.

References

External links
 Official website
 Pictures of Gidle and its neighbourhood

Villages in Radomsko County
Catholic pilgrimage sites